Glainach-Ferlach Airport is a public use airport located  east-northeast of Ferlach, Kärnten, Austria.

See also
List of airports in Austria

References

External links 
 Airport record for Glainach-Ferlach Airport at Landings.com

Airports in Austria
Carinthia (state)